Dungar Junction railway station is a  railway station on the Western Railway network in the state of Gujarat, India. Dungar Junction railway station is 22 km away from Mahuva Junction railway station. Passenger trains halt here.

References

See also
 Bhavnagar district

Railway stations in Bhavnagar district
Bhavnagar railway division
Railway junction stations in Gujarat